"The Boy King" may refer to:

 Tutankhamun (c. 1341 BC – c. 1323 BC), Egyptian pharaoh of the 18th dynasty
 Edward VI of England (1537–1553), English king of the Tudor dynasty